The Finsterwalder Speedfex is a German high-wing, single-place, hang glider, designed and produced by Finsterwalder.

Design and development
The Speedfex was designed as man-packable double-surface competition glider for cross country flying. As such the Speedfex weighs only  and can be reduced to a folded size of 

The aircraft is made from aluminum tubing, with the wing covered in Dacron sailcloth. Its  span wing is cable braced from a single kingpost. The nose angle is 130° and the aspect ratio is 7.1:1. The glider is certified as DHV Class 2.

Specifications (Speedfex)

References

External links

Hang gliders